Payena maingayi is a species of plant in the family Sapotaceae. It is found in Malaysia and Singapore.

References

maingayi
Least concern plants
Taxonomy articles created by Polbot